2016 Munich attack may refer to:

 2016 Munich knife attack, on 10 May 2016 in the town of Grafing
 2016 Munich shooting, on 22 July 2016 in the Moosach district of Munich